Trevor Mack (born June 28, 1992) is a Tsilhqot'in, Dakelh, Canadian filmmaker, writer, photographer and former Crashed Ice extreme sports athlete. 

He is best known for writing, directing, and producing the short films The Blanketing, Clouds of Autumn and In the Valley of Wild Horses. His debut feature-length film Portraits from a Fire made its world premiere at the 2021 Atlantic International Film Festival and was the first ever narrative feature film written and directed by a Tsilhqot'in filmmaker.

He competed in the Canadian tour of the Red Bull Crashed Ice World Championships from 2011 to 2015.

Film career 
At 15 years old, Mack started his pursuit in film by editing together footage from the popular Xbox video game series Halo to create montages in which he posted to on-line forums and YouTube. As he gained popularity with his Halo montages, he helped co-found a freelance video editing, motion graphics, and videography group called 'Viral Design' that produced product promotional videos for companies such as Red Bull, SteelSeries, and Gunnar Optiks.

In 2011, Mack enrolled in the 'Motion Picture Arts' film program at Capilano University in North Vancouver, BC. Having failed his first year, Mack dropped out in his second year of courses.

The day after he dropped out of film school he started working with the Provincial Health Services Authority in a suicide-awareness pilot program titled 'Cuystwi'. Throughout the several years of working on the project, Mack collaborated with Indigenous filmmakers such as Damien Bouchard, Amanda Strong, and Asia Youngman. The filmmakers would routinely travel to reserve communities in British Columbia that registered for the pilot program to teach children how to express themselves through filmmaking.

The Blanketing (2013) 
The Blanketing is a fictional, alternative-history story that combines two distinct and crucial events within the Tsilhqot'in-Colonial historical canon. Both the 1864 Tsilhqot'in War and 1862 Pacific Northwest smallpox epidemic were combined, narratively, to showcase how devastating the events were towards the Tsilhqot'in people. Yet, the film ends on uplifting and defying imagery -- a theme Mack would continually bring to his future films.
In the fall of 2011, Mack started a Crowd funding campaign asking for funds for his first short film The Blanketing. After 10 months of development and pre-production he began principal photography in the summer of 2012.

After he premiered the short film in his home town of Williams Lake, British Columbia on May 3, 2013, the short film was accepted into the following film festivals:

 2013 imagineNATIVE Film + Media Arts Festival
 2013 Toronto Independent Film Festival
 2013 Vancouver Indigenous Media Arts Festival
 2013 Red Nation Film Festival
 2014 Square Pegs IV Film Festival

Clouds of Autumn (2015) 
Clouds of Autumn follows a brother and sister whose carefree childhood in a Tsilhqot'in community is torn apart when the sister is forced to attend a Canadian residential school in the early 1970s.

Interestingly, Mack collaborated with non-Indigenous filmmaker Matthew Taylor Blais, whom Mack was roommates with at the time. The purpose of the collaboration was to learn about one another's culture by deliberately telling such a controversial story together.

Mack's maternal grandmother gave birth to 13 children, 10 of whom -- including his mother -- were taken away to Canadian residential schools in the interior of British Columbia, Canada. Some were as young as 6 years old when they were taken away for the entire school year.

After receiving a production grant from Canada Council for the Arts, Mack started principal photography for Clouds of Autumn in August 2014.
The film had its North American premiere at the 2015 Toronto International Film Festival and also screened at the following festivals, among others:

 2015 Vancouver International Film Festival
 2015 Ottawa International Film Festival
 2015 Tacoma Film Festival
 2015 Whistler Film Festival
 2015 imagineNATIVE Film + Media Arts Festival
 2016 Air Canada enRoute Film Festival
In October 2015, the imagineNATIVE Film + Media Arts Festival awarded 'Best Canadian Short Drama' to Clouds of Autumn.

In September 2016,  Festival Cine Alter'Natif awarded 'Prix Jeunesse' to Clouds of Autumn

In November 2016, the Air Canada EnRoute Film Festival awarded 'Achievement in Cinematography' to Clouds of Autumn.

ʔEtsu (Grandmother) (2017) 
With only a $500 budget, Mack collaborated with actor Elias Louie (Clouds of Autumn) in the summer of 2017. The short film is a POV-styled portrait of child abuse and family relations on an isolated reserve in Canada. The film premiered at the 2017 Toronto International Film Festival and played at the 2017 Vancouver International Film Festival.

In The Valley of Wild Horses (2018) 
Partnering with the Xeni Gwe'tin First Nations, a community apart of the Tsilhqot'in nation, Mack co-directed the short documentary with fellow Indigenous filmmaker Asia Youngman. The film follows the Xeni Gwet'in Youth Wagon trip, a 200-km, 8-day horse-and-wagon trip beginning from Nemiah Valley and ending at Williams Lake. The film premiered at the 2018 Vancouver International Film Festival, among others:

 2019 Las Cruces International Film Festival
 2019 Māoriland Film Festival
 2019 Salt Spring Film Festival
 2019 Powell River Film Festival

Portraits from a Fire (2021) 

Portraits from a Fire is Trevor Mack's debut feature-length film. The project was a collaboration between Mack and writers Manny Mahal and Derek Vermillion, as well as with cinematographer Kaayla Wachell and producers Kate Kroll and Rylan Friday. The inception of the story came from Mack's healing process after being assaulted and mugged in downtown Vancouver in 2016. Portraits from a Fire is a coming-of-age film following an eccentric misfit named Tyler who spends his days recording and vlogging his Indigenous community and hanging out with his grandparents. That is until he meets Aaron—an older, influential teenager who pushes him to show his latest work about his family to the community, leading to a reckoning between the past and the future, life and death, parents and son. The film made its world premiere at the 2021 Atlantic International Film Festival in Halifax, Nova Scotia, as well as played in the following festivals:
 2021 FIN Atlantic International Film Festival

 2021 Vancouver International Film Festival
 2021 imagineNATIVE Film + Media Arts Festival
 2021 Edmonton International Film Festival
 2021 American Indian Film Festival
 2021 Cinéfest Sudbury Film Festival
 2022 Canada China International Film Festival
 2022 Virginia Film Festival
 2022 Shining Mountains Film Festival

As of January 2023, Portraits from a Fire has accumulated 15 awards:
Best Feature Film, 2021 Edmonton International Film Festival
 Best B.C. Film & B.C. Emerging Filmmaker Award: Trevor Mack, 2021 Vancouver International Film Festival
 Best Director: Trevor Mack & Best Supporting Actor: Asivak Koostachin, 2021 American Indian Film Festival 
 Best Script, 2021 Canada China International Film Festival
 Kevin Tierney Emerging Producer Award: Kate Kroll, Rylan Friday, Trevor Mack, 2021 Indiescreen Awards

 Best Picture & Best Direction & Best Cinematography & Best Score & Best Editing, 2022 Leo Awards
 Best Picture & One to Watch: Trevor Mack, 2022 Vancouver Film Critics Circle
 Best Feature Film, 2022 Shining Mountains Film Festival

Red Bull Crashed Ice World Championships 

While also producing his first short films, Mack was simultaneously competing in the Canadian tour of the Red Bull Crashed Ice World Championships. From 2011 to 2015, Red Bull Crashed Ice hosted Canadian tours of the World Championships in Quebec City, Niagara Falls, and Edmonton.

Psychedelic Plant Medicine Activism 
Mack has credited his latest film work on his experiences with Psychedelic plant medicine, namely psilocybin mushrooms, Lsd, and Yopo.

On June 20, 2021, Mack was invited to speak about alongside famed author and professor Wade Davis, plant medicine teacher Jazmin Pirozek, and Kim Haxton for the inaugural World Psychedelics Day, which featured an eclectic roster of talks with speakers such as Dr. Dennis McKenna, Paul Stamets, Dr. Gabor Mate, Dr. Andrew Weil, and Alex and Allyson Grey. The panel Mack spoke to was titled 'Indigenous Sovereignty & Plant Medicines'.

References

External links 
Trevor Mack official website

1992 births
Living people
Activists from British Columbia
First Nations filmmakers
Tsilhqot'in people
First Nations screenwriters
21st-century Canadian screenwriters
21st-century Canadian male writers
Canadian male screenwriters
Film directors from Vancouver